Buckinghamshire Council was elected for the first time in 2021, with subsequent elections to be held every fourth year thereafter. A total of 147 councillors were elected, with the 49 wards electing 3 councillors each.

Background
The inaugural election was supposed to be in May 2020, but was postponed until May 2021 due to the COVID-19 pandemic. For this reason, it was announced on 18 March 2020 that all of the current shadow authority members would become councillors and the shadow executive members would form the cabinet. The first election to the new authority was eventually held in May 2021.

Political control
Since 2020, political control of the council has been held by the following parties:

Leadership
The leader of the council from its creation in 2020 is:

Martin Tett had previously been leader of Buckinghamshire County Council since 2011.

Council elections
 2021 Buckinghamshire Council election (inaugural election)

References

Council elections in Buckinghamshire
Unitary authority elections in England